Juicio Final (1998) (Spanish for "Final Judgement" 1998) was a professional wrestling supercard show, scripted and produced by Consejo Mundial de Lucha Libre (CMLL), which took place on December 18, 1998, in Arena México, Mexico City, Mexico. The show served as the year-end finale for CMLL before Arena México, CMLL's main venue, closed down for the winter for renovations and to host  Circo Atayde . The shows replaced the regular Super Viernes ("Super Friday") shows held by CMLL since the mid-1930s.

The main event of the show was the finals of a three week long tournament for the vacant CMLL World Trios Championship. In the end the team of Black Warrior, Blue Panther and Dr. Wagner Jr. defeated Los Guapos (Bestia Salvaje), Scorpio Jr. and Zumbido to win the championship. The show featured five additional matches.

Production

Background
For decades Arena México, the main venue of the Mexican professional wrestling promotion Consejo Mundial de Lucha Libre (CMLL), would close down in early December and remain closed into either January or February to allow for renovations as well as letting Circo Atayde occupy the space over the holidays. As a result CMLL usually held a "end of the year" supercard show on the first or second Friday of December in lieu of their normal Super Viernes show. 1955 was the first year where CMLL used the name "El Juicio Final" ("The Final Judgement") for their year-end supershow. Until 2000 the Jucio Final name was always used for the year end show, but since 2000 has at times been used for shows outside of December. It is no longer an annually recurring show, but instead held intermittently sometimes several years apart and not always in the same month of the year either. All Juicio Final shows have been held in Arena México in Mexico City, Mexico which is CMLL's main venue, its "home".

Storylines

The 1998 Juicio Final show featured five professional wrestling matches scripted by CMLL with some wrestlers involved in scripted feuds. The wrestlers portray either heels (referred to as rudos in Mexico, those that play the part of the "bad guys") or faces (técnicos in Mexico, the "good guy" characters) as they perform.

In October 1998, Mr. Niebla suffered an injury, which forced CMLL to vacate the CMLL World Trios Championship as it was not clear when Mr. Niebla would be able to wrestle again. They held a three-show, eight-team tournament from December 4 to December 12, 1998. Former champions Atlantis and Lizmark teamed up with Emilio Charles Jr. for the tournament, while Mr. Niebla actually returned to action in time to be in the tournament as well, teaming up with Rayo de Jalisco Jr. and Shocker. In the finals the trio of Dr. Wagner Jr., Blue Panther and Black Warrior defeated Los Guapos (Scorpio Jr., Bestia Salvaje and Zumbido) to lay claim to the championship.

Tournament brackets

Results

References

1998 in Mexico
1998 in professional wrestling
CMLL Juicio Final